Astore Wildlife Sanctuary is as wildlife refuge located in Gilgit–Baltistan, Pakistan.

The sanctuary is home to a small population of the near threatened (since 2015) Astor Markhor, the national animal of Pakistan, it further provides home to endangered snow leopard, Himalayan brown bear and Eurasian lynx.

References

Wildlife sanctuaries of Pakistan
Protected areas of Gilgit-Baltistan